The Kettering Incident is an Australian television drama program, first broadcast on Foxtel's Showcase channel on 4 July 2016. 

The series was created by Victoria Madden and Vincent Sheehan, and was written by Victoria Madden, Louise Fox, Cate Shortland and Andrew Knight. A sneak preview of the series launched at the 2015 Dark MoFo festival, with two episodes shown to select audiences at nine locations around Tasmania.

The series was filmed in and around the town of Kettering and Bruny Island in Tasmania, as announced in February 2014 by the then Premier of Tasmania, Lara Giddings, during a press conference in Kettering. The series was funded by Screen Australia, Screen Tasmania, Foxtel and BBC Worldwide, and was developed with the assistance of British broadcaster Channel 4.

The series was budgeted at fifteen million dollars, and was promoted as the first adult drama filmed in Tasmania. The series was directed by Rowan Woods and Tony Krawitz. The executive producer is Penny Win. A second series was in development in May 2017 but series creator Victoria Madden confirmed on Twitter in June 2018 that it was ultimately not picked up by Foxtel.

Synopsis
Anna Macy (Elizabeth Debicki) left Kettering when she was just fourteen, shortly after her best friend (and paternal half-sister), Gillian Baxter, mysteriously disappeared. The two girls had been cycling through the forbidden forests outside Kettering when they saw strange lights in the sky. Eight hours later, Anna was found alone, terrified and covered in blood.

Fifteen years later, Anna returns to find the town struggling to survive. The forests have been marked for logging and the town is on edge following violent clashes between environmentalists and the local loggers. Anna's reappearance causes a stir when another local girl, Chloe Holloway (Sianoa Smit-McPhee), suddenly disappears, prompting Anna to discover what really happened the night Gillian disappeared, uncovering secrets that threaten the future of Kettering.

Cast

Main cast
 Elizabeth Debicki as Anna Macy
 Matthew Le Nevez as Detective Brian Dutch
 Henry Nixon as Officer Fergus McFadden
 Anthony Phelan as Roy Macy
 Damon Gameau as Jens Jorgenssen
 Damien Garvey as Max Holloway
 Sacha Horler as Barbara Holloway
 Brad Kannegiesser as Adam Holloway
 Sianoa Smit-McPhee as Chloe Holloway

Supporting cast
 Suzi Dougherty as Renae Baxter
 Kevin MacIsaac as Travis Kingston
 Alison Whyte as Deb Russell
 Tilda Cobham-Hervey as Eliza Grayson
 Dylan Young as Dane Sullivan
 Neil Pigot as Dominic Harold
 Nathan Spencer as Lewis Sullivan
 Marcus Hensley as Mick MacDonald
 Matthew Burton as Singlet Russell
 Miranda Bennett as Gillian Baxter
 Ben Oxenbould as Craig Grayson
 Katie Robertson as Sandra Hull
 Maddison Brown as Anna Macy when young
 Kris McQuade as Fiona McKenzie
 Thomas Readman as Kade Fisher
 Maya Jean as Matilda Russell

Episodes

Reception

Ratings
The series debuted to 115,000 viewers across its two episode premiere, making it the most watched non-sport title on the Foxtel platform. The figure does not include replays, streams or timeshift viewers.

Accolades

See also
 Tasmanian Gothic

References

External links 
 
 The Kettering Incident filming locations

Showcase (Australian TV channel) original programming
Australian drama television series
2016 Australian television series debuts
2016 Australian television series endings
2010s Australian television miniseries
Television shows set in Tasmania
English-language television shows